Xander Marro (born 1975) is an American artist, underground puppet maker, and arts non-profit director based in Providence, Rhode Island.

Work 
She is a member of the Dirt Palace, a feminist art collective, where she makes movies, puppet shows, prints, and phone calls. She curated the long-running "Movies with Live Soundtracks" series and toured with "Bird Songs of the Bauharoque," a two-woman puppet operetta starring her alter-egos, Lady Longarms and Madame von Temper Tantrum, as well as the alter-ego of Becky Stark, who is Marro's other half in the band Lavender Diamond. In her spare time she works as the Managing Director of Providence Not-for-Profit arts organization AS220. She graduated from Brown University in Art/Semiotics. 

Marro is described by the Providence Phoenix as a "puppet-maker and projectionist steeped in the underground."

See also
Pippi Zornoza

References

External links
 Official website
 Dirt Palace
 Ruffles, Repair & Ritual: The Fine Art of Fixing. RISD Museum. June 02, 2019.
 Marro's works at the RISD Museum
 Marro's works in the Brown Digital Repository

Living people
American puppeteers
American artists
Brown University alumni
1975 births